Le Stade Chapou (or Stade Jacques-Chapou) was a stadium that was located rue des Amidonniers in Toulouse.

Called Stade du T.O.E.C. before War World II, then Stade du Général Huntziger during the war, then Stade Chapou after the war (in tribute to Jacques Chapou (1909-1944), French Resistant).

This stadium is destroyed in 1965 for building a residence of students for the faculty.

1938 FIFA World Cup
The Stade du T.O.E.C. in the old Parc des Sports was one of the venues of the 1938 FIFA World Cup, and held the following matches (initially planned to the new stadium of the new Parc des Sports):

1938 FIFA World Cup stadiums